Agustín Caffaro (born 6 February 1995) is an Argentine basketball player who plays as a center for Argentina and Peñarol Mar del Plata of the Liga Nacional de Básquet (LNB). He was named in Argentine squad for the 2019 FIBA Basketball World Cup.

National team career 
Agustín made his senior international debut for Argentina at the 2019 FIBA Basketball World Cup Qualifiers against Puerto Rico on 22 February 2019. He was also a key member of the Argentine team which claimed gold medal at the 2019 Pan American Games for the first time since 1995. Agustín clinched silver medal with Argentina which emerged as runners-up to Spain at the 2019 FIBA Basketball World Cup.

References

External links 
 Agustín Caffaro at the 2019 Pan American Games

1995 births
Living people
Argentine men's basketball players
Centers (basketball)
Pan American Games gold medalists for Argentina
Basketball players at the 2019 Pan American Games
Pan American Games medalists in basketball
2019 FIBA Basketball World Cup players
Sportspeople from Santa Fe, Argentina
Medalists at the 2019 Pan American Games